Gamle Oslo is a borough of the city of Oslo, Norway. The name means "Old Oslo", and the district contains Old Town.

The borough has several landmarks and large parks, including the Edvard Munch Museum, the Botanical Gardens and a medieval park.

During the time that present Oslo was named Christiania, this area was called Oslo. H. P. Lovecraft alludes to the fact in his story The Call of Cthulhu:

Neighborhoods of Oslo belonging to this borough are:
 Ekebergskråningen
 Enerhaugen
 Ensjø
 Etterstad
 Gamlebyen
 Grønland
 Helsfyr
 Kampen
 Tøyen
 Vålerenga
 Valle-Hovin

The borough also includes islands and islets in the Oslofjord: Kavringen, Nakholmen, Lindøya, Hovedøya, Bleikøya, Gressholmen, Rambergøya, Langøyene and Heggholmen.

In the municipal election of 2007 all borough councils became elective, until then most had been appointed by the city council. Labour became the largest party with 5 representatives, the Socialist Left have 3, the Conservatives, Liberals and the Red Electoral Alliance 2 each, and the Progress party 1.

Politics 
As a borough of Oslo, Gamle Oslo is governed by the city council of Oslo as well as its own borough council. The council leader is Emil Snorre Alnæs from the Green Party and the deputy leader is Agnes Viljugrein, of the Labour Party. The Green Party has the most seats. The 15 seats are distributed among the following political parties for the 2019–2023 term:

 4 from the Green Party (Miljøpartiet de Grønne)
 3 from the Labour Party (Arbeiderpartiet)
 2 from the Conservative Party (Høyre)
 2 from the Socialist Left Party (Sosialistisk Venstreparti)
 2 from the Red Party (Rødt)
 1 from the Liberal Party (Venstre)
 1 from the Progress Party (Fremskrittspartiet)

Squatting
Places formerly known for squatting, includes Brakkebygrenda (a.k.a. Brækkers).

Gallery

References

 
Boroughs of Oslo